Arabaka Rural LLG is a local-level government (LLG) of Madang Province, Papua New Guinea.

Wards
01. Gokta
02. Jakipuat
03. Atiapi
04. Diam
05. Moibu
06. Gragebu
07. Nodabu
08. Paibu
09. Watabu
10. Grengabu
11. Chungribu
12. Limbubu
13. Kwanga
14. Askunka
15. Misingi
16. Nambringi
17. Bumbera
18. Bunungum
19. Gosingi
20. Brokoto
21. Akurukai (Akrukay language speakers)
22. Wawapi
23. Ipokondor
24. Rarapi
25. Awam
26. Akavangu (Nend language speakers)
27. Astangu
28. Atemble (Mand language speakers)
29. Iporaitz
30. Iragarat
31. Anamunk
32. Apanam
33. Jogoi
34. Sotobu

References

Local-level governments of Madang Province